Guapi may refer to:

 Guapi, Cauca, a town in the Cauca Department, Colombia
 Guapi Island, in Ranco Lake, southern Chile
 Guapi River, a river in the Cauca Department, Colombia